The Government of Uttar Pradesh in India, has faced protests against its proposed forced land acquisition in 2011. These protests have been centred on the twin adjacent villages of Bhatta and Parsaul near Dankaur in Gautam Buddha Nagar district and have resulted in sporadic incidents of violence since January of that year. In August 2010 there had been protests against the state government in Delhi and these had resulted in three deaths.

The issue is controversial because around 65% of the Indian population is economically dependent on agriculture but the government has the power to requisition any private land which it thinks is needed for a "public purpose". Past examples of this included several acquisitions by regional authorities across India for the purpose of developing Special Economic Zones to boost the economy and create jobs. In this instance, the state government of Uttar Pradesh has requisitioned the land for the building of the Yamuna Expressway, a road linking Agra to Greater Noida (near Delhi).

Land acquisition in India

Laws relating to land acquisition in India, by the government from the governed, date back to 1800s. Amongst these were:

Regulation I of 1824, Bengal Code which aimed to enable the officers of the Government to obtain, at a fair valuation, land or other property for public purposes. This code was used by the British to acquire land for salt manufacture.
Bombay Presidency, Act XXVIII, 1839 which aimed to enable the British to acquire land for public purposes in the Islands of Bombay and Colaba.
Act VI of 1857, British India which repealed local Acts above, and laid down one law for acquisition of land in the whole of British India.
The India Act XVIII, 1885 which enacted rules for expedient acquisition of land in British India for mines and minerals. Prior laws did not cover cases where resources were situated under the land which the Government sought to acquire. The 1885 Act addressed this, as well included rules laid down in sections 7785 of the English Railway Clauses Consolidation Act.
The Land Acquisition Act of 1894 was a comprehensive law enacted in British India. This Act of 1894 is the basis for Indian government's current procedures for land acquisition for public purpose.
The Land Acquisition Act of 1894 has been controversial and was challenged in the past. The Act was reviewed by various committees appointed by the Government of India. For example, in 1967, a committee was appointed by Resolution No. 6-6/67-Gen II by the Government of India to study, consult and recommend principles to amend the 1894 Act. This committee was chaired by Anand Mulla, had over 20 members selected from different sections of Indian society, and it submitted its report. As a result of such reviews, The Land Acquisition Act of 1894 has been amended several times, after India's independence from Britain in 1947, by various democratically elected governments of India. The Amendments have been duly passed in some cases by the central government, and in other cases by the state governments in India, such as the Amendment and Validation Act of 1967 by the state of Karnataka.
The Land Acquisition Act of 1894 is not the only Act surviving from the times of British India. Indian Penal Code of 1860 forms the backbone of criminal law in India. Modern India's laws, like the laws of many economically developed countries such as the United States, are largely based on English common law. The Land Acquisition laws in India have the same historical foundation and are similar to the Eminent Domain laws in Europe and United States.

Need of land for infrastructure development
Since its independence in 1947 and through 1991, India's economic progress was slow. With market reforms and economic liberalisation in India starting in 1991, India has emerged as a rapidly growing economy. This economic growth demands infrastructure.

According to a McKinsey report, India has ~500 kilometers of paved road per 1000 square kilometers, but the road quality is well below global standards, close to 90% of highways are structurally inadequate to support the 10.2 tonne load per axle that trucks carry. Similarly, McKinsey believes India's port and power generation infrastructure is already stretched, and major improvements are needed to support India's economic growth.

India has launched an array of projects to meet these infrastructure needs. According to MoSPI, India's Ministry of Statistics and Programme Implementation, as of January 2011, over 140 mega infrastructure projects were in progress, financed by the central government of India, each worth over Rs. 10 billion ($225 million), and a combined total of over Rs. 5,37,628 crores ($100+ billion). Of these, as of January 2011, 50% of the projects were delayed between few months to as much as 6 years. The Government of India claims one of the causes for these delays is land acquisition issues such as high land compensation demanded by farmers.

In addition to mega projects by India's central government, numerous large projects are under progress led by state governments or private entrepreneurs. For example, the Uttar Pradesh government has launched a number of energy projects and expressway projects such as Yamuna Expressway and the Ganga Expressway. The Haryana government has launched the KMP Expressway project.

Infrastructure is also necessary in India for disaster relief and disaster prevention. According to The Indian Red Cross, the Indian sub-continent is highly prone to droughts, floods and other natural calamities. Floods are the most regular and devastating, with an average of 18.6 million hectare of land is flooded annually, and over 40 million hectare of land is flood prone. Drought is an eternal feature of Indian livelihood. 18% of the country's total area, and 68% of the total cultivated area is estimated as drought prone. Approximately half of the Indian population is affected by drought annually. Earthquakes and cyclones are other major sources of disasters, with the Indian Ocean amongst the six key cyclone-prone regions in the world. According to India's Ministry of Home Affairs, between 1990–2000, about 30 million people were affected by disasters every year, over 4000 people lost their lives every year in India, and the nation suffers heavy losses in economic assets from these disasters every year. India's Ministry of Home Affairs reports that it is the poor and the under-privileged who are worst affected by natural disasters; additionally, these disasters retard socio-economic development, further impoverishing the impoverished. The routine flood relief, drought relief, and other disaster relief efforts lead to diversion of scarce resources from development to rehabilitation and reconstruction. As a result, the Government of India has sought a paradigm shift by focusing on investments in mitigation, which it believes are much more cost effective than expenditure on relief and rehabilitation. Disaster mitigation infrastructure investments are amongst the priorities of the Indian government. These infrastructures require land.

The World Bank estimates India will add over 90 million people to its population between 2009 and 2015 (an average of 15 million people per year). India needs homes to house its growing population. Even without the needs of its growing population, India faces shortages of urban and rural housing for its existing population. Homes and housing projects require land.

The government of Uttar Pradesh has launched several initiatives on infrastructure and urban development. Three of these focus on expressways, namely: Yamuna Expressway, Ganga Expressway and Upper Ganga Canal Expressway. Each of these expressways pass along the major rivers and rural regions of Uttar Pradesh. The infrastructure development department of the government of Uttar Pradesh, in its 2007 proposal request for one of these expressways, cites the following benefits for the infrastructure project and the associated land works identified in the proposal:

Provide flood protection to large population and number of villages along river
Decongest the increasing traffic on the existing network of roads
Fast and safe connectivity resulting in savings in fuel, travel time and transportation cost to society
Employment opportunity to people
Development of local industry, agriculture and handicrafts
Development of tourism and pilgrimage
Transporting, processing and marketing of agricultural products
Reduction in accidents
Reduction in pollution
Better approach to medical and educational services
Quick transportation of perishable goods like fruits, vegetables and dairy products

The International Monetary Fund has identified land acquisition as a significant constraint to India's infrastructure needs. The IMF believes structural reforms are needed in India to lower the cost of infrastructure, encourage private investment, and allow more efficient use of public resources.

According to The World Bank, about 60% of India's land is agricultural land and 70% of India's population is rural. All infrastructure projects, and particularly roads that connect cities and farmlands, impact the farmers and their ability to earn a livelihood from farms.

2007–2011 Land acquisitions

The Yamuna Expressway project is located in the state of Uttar Pradesh. The expressway aims to connect Greater Noida and Agra, and open up avenue for industrial and urban development. The authority for its implementation was initiated by the democratically elected state government of Uttar Pradesh in April 2001. The land acquisition process began in September 2007.

The first 40 kilometers of the Yamuna Expressway is located in Gautam Buddha Nagar district, passing Noida, followed by 20 kilometers in Aligarh district, passing Tappal. The next 90 kilometers are in Mathura district, followed by approximately 15 kilometres in Agra district, with the expressway ending near Etmadpur, a village in Agra. The expressway has been paved to be six lanes, with space to expand to eight lanes. The total width of the six lane dual carriageway is about 38 meters, and will be about 45 meters when the expressway is expanded from six lanes to eight lanes. The total length of the expressway is 165 kilometers. The total land dedicated for the Yamuna Expressway is about 7.5 square kilometers (~3 square miles).

The Yamuna Expressway Project is larger than just the expressway. The Project aims to dedicate land for industrial and urban development. The Yamuna Expressway Industrial Development Authority has notified 133 villages for land acquisition purposes.

Land acquisition process in Uttar Pradesh

In 2011, the state government of Uttar Pradesh announced "Karar Niyamavali" as the guiding policy for land acquisition by the government from the citizens of its state.

"Karar Niyamavali" policy's section 6 provides certain protections to any farmer whose land has been fraudulently transacted. The rules require that any such transaction be considered for appeal and cancelled. The farmer whose land has been fraudulently transacted has a right to compensation and damages from the state government whenever fraud is discovered and reported.

The announced policy for land acquisition by Uttar Pradesh has three parts:

Infrastructure projects such as highways and canals will be based on "karar niyamavali" (mutual agreement) process
Planned development will be based on "karar niyamavali" process
Commercial projects led by private developers will require the developers to get prior consent of 70 percent of affected farmers before the project can be reviewed by the state. The private developer will be required to give 16 percent of the developed land back to the farmers.

The land acquisition policy announced in June 2011 by the state government of Uttar Pradesh provides the following compensation to the farmers from whom land is being acquired,:

An annuity for 33 years of Rs. 23,000 per acre ($510 per acre every year), plus an increase of Rs. 800 per acre every year; or,
A lumpsum upfront payment of Rs. 2,76,000 per acre ($6,100 per acre)

Land acquisition controversies

There have been past controversies elsewhere in India regarding land acquisition proposals, including those of 2008 regarding the Singur Tata Nano controversy at Singur in West Bengal, and protests in 2009 at Chandigarh.

In addition, there have been allegations of arrangements between politicians, the police, bureaucracy and the land mafia, including in the states of Punjab and Uttar Pradesh. The allegations claim that the nexus has used the existing land acquisition law, which dates from 1894, for commercial or corporate gain.

Protest timeline
The cause of the May 2011 protests in Uttar Pradesh are disputed: the protestors claim that they are a direct consequence of the land acquisition has been challenged by the state government, which has stated that the acquisitions had been completed by July 2010 and that the 2011 protests were due to "anti-social" elements encouraging the violence. The farmers believe that the compensation paid by the state government for their land was inadequate, whereas the government believes it to be generous.

2011

6 May
Three officials from the Uttar Pradesh State Road Transport Corporation, a public transport body, were kidnapped by inhabitants of Bhatta village and Parsaul village near Dankaur while in the area to conduct a survey.

7–9 May
Violence erupted on 7 May as police moved in to rescue the abducted men, This included a three-hour gun battle between the villagers and police force, which led to the death of two policemen and two civilians, as well as several injured casualties. A number of local farmers were arrested, entry to the village was effectively shut off and Section 144 (a measure to limit unlawful assembly) was imposed in an attempt to quell the troubles.

The violence continued on 8 May and the state government deployed 2,000 policemen on 9 May.

11 May
Rahul Gandhi, the president of the Indian youth congress reached the village after eluding the police. He conducted a dharna and was subsequently briefly taken into "preventative custody".

16–19 May
Rahul Gandhi claimed that he had seen evidence that many farmers had been murdered and some women raped during the state reaction to the protests. He had seen a heap of ash in the village "with dead bodies inside". There were claims that the situation was now being exploited for political ends by the Congress Party, of which Gandhi and his extended family are prominent members, with elections being due to take place in the state. However, an investigation by the BBC could find nothing to support the allegations, although there was anger regarding the violent beatings and similar actions which had occurred. It was suggested that the numerous farmers who were missing had simply fled the village and not yet returned. Gandhi subsequently attempted to backtrack on his remarks, claiming that he had been misrepresented and then that he had based his comments on conversations with the villagers, but the BBC reporter maintained that he had in fact made the allegations as originally reported. The governing Bahujan Samaj Party subsequently announced that Gandhi's allegations were baseless.

2012

6 March
Rahul Gandhi and his Indian National Congress party made land acquisition protests and farmer agitation as one of the 2012 Assembly Election issues in Bhatta village and Parsaul village. The party nominee, Dhirendra Singh, however was rejected by the electorate of both Bhatta and Parsaul. Instead, Vedram Bhati of the incumbent party BSP was elected back to the Uttar Pradesh Assembly elections of 2012.

Crushed Dreams Documentary
Many film makers used the Bhatta Parsaul incident in their movies, like Matru ki Bijali Ka Mandola and Ranjhna. Some local journalists who have been covered the Bhatta Parsaul farmer's protest and bloody fighting between farmers and police, also making a Documentary on the issue of land acquisition and its implications on society. "Crushed Dreams" named documentary is produced by Pankaj Parashar, Chief Sub Editor Hindustan daily and directed by Pradeep Singh & Abhishek kumar a Journalist & Documentary Film maker. Documentary has been certified by Central Board of Film Certification, New Delhi on 30 August 2013 under V/U category. The documentary contains the interviews of widows of Bhatta Parsaul and Ghodi Bachheda villages, who were sought dead in police firing during protest against the land acquisition. Environment decay, Out of control pollution, Liquor abuse in youth generation, Over expanses in marriages and Critical conditions of landless families in region are the subjects of Crushed Dreams.

Proposed new Land Acquisition Act
Manmohan Singh, Prime minister of India, has promised to amend the old land acquisition bill and to introduce a new Land Acquisition and Rehabilitation Bill in the Monsoon parliamentary session of 2011. JD-U leader Sharad Yadav has demanded that the government stops land acquisition until parliament has enacted a new law, although it is unclear whether he was referring to the state government or that of India as a whole.

See also
Land Acquisition Act, 1894
Land mafia in India
Land reform in India
Land acquisition in India

References

Protests in India
2011 in Indian politics
Politics of Uttar Pradesh
Land acquisition protests in Uttar Pradesh
History of Uttar Pradesh (1947–present)